Batwoman is a fictional character appearing in comic books published by DC Comics.

Batwoman or Bat Woman may also refer to:

DC Comics topics
 Batwoman (identity), a DC Comics identity which multiple characters have used
 Batwoman (Kathy Kane), a DC Comics character
 Batwoman (TV series), a CW TV series
 Kate Kane (Arrowverse), the first Batwoman
 Ryan Wilder, the second Batwoman
 Batwoman (comic book), a monthly comic series published by DC Comics

Other uses
 A woman batman (military)
 Shi Zhengli, a Chinese researcher studying bat coronaviruses at the Wuhan Institute of Virology

See also

 
 
 Batswoman
 Batman (disambiguation)
 Batgirl (disambiguation)
 Batter (disambiguation)